Singapore, officially the State of Singapore, was one of the 14 states of Malaysia from 1963 to 1965. Malaysia was formed on 16 September 1963 by the merger of the Federation of Malaya with the former British colonies of North Borneo, Sarawak and Singapore. This marked the end of the 144-year British rule in Singapore which began with the founding of modern Singapore by Sir Stamford Raffles in 1819. At the time of merger, it was the smallest state in the country by land area, and was the country's largest city behind the capital, Kuala Lumpur.

The union was unstable due to distrust and ideological differences between the leaders of Singapore and of the federal government of Malaysia. They often disagreed about finance, politics and racial policies. Singapore continued to face significant trade restrictions despite promises of a common market in return for a large proportion of its tax revenues, and retaliated by withholding loans to Sabah and Sarawak. In the political arena, the Malaysia-based United Malays National Organisation (UMNO) and Singapore-based People's Action Party (PAP), entered each other's political arenas, despite previous agreements not to do so. These resulted in major race riots in Singapore in 1964, which were attributed (at least in part) to instigation by UMNO and its Malay-language newspaper Utusan Melayu for affirmative action for Malays in Singapore.

These culminated in the decision by Malaysian Prime Minister Tunku Abdul Rahman to expel Singapore from the Federation, and on 9 August 1965, Singapore became independent.

Prelude to merger

Singapore politicians, beginning with David Marshall in 1955, repeatedly courted the Tunku Abdul Rahman about merger with the Federation, but were rebuffed repeatedly. Tunku's chief consideration was the need to maintain the racial balance in the Federation, UMNO's position in the Alliance Party, and Malay political dominance. Including Singapore with its large Chinese population would result in the Chinese (at 3.6 million) outnumbering the 3.4 million Malays in the new union, and put it "at-risk".

Balanced against this risk was his even greater fear of an independent Singapore outside the federation, particularly if it fell under the control of an unfriendly government. As part of decolonisation and increasing British disengagement from Malaya, constitutional talks on self-government for Singapore between the British Colonial Office in London and the Singapore Legislative Assembly had already resulted in the 1958 State of Singapore Constitution, and a fully elected and self-governing 51-seat Legislative Assembly in 1959. Tunku worried that the next round of constitutional talks would grant Singapore even more independence and put the island beyond his or Britain's reach; as British officials put it, a 'batik curtain' would descend across the Straits of Johor, beyond which political elements and possibly even a 'communist Cuba' would gather strength. This fear became increasingly real to Tunku after 29 April 1961 when Ong Eng Guan of the left-wing United Peoples' Party trounced the PAP candidate at the Hong Lim by-election.

Tunku was also worried about Indonesia, the other regional Malay behemoth, which under Sukarno's Guided Democracy was becoming increasingly nationalistic and expansionist, undertaking regional actions such as the liberation of West New Guinea and Konfrontasi (also known as the Borneo confrontation).

With these considerations in mind, and although it was not apparent at the time, Tunku had already been considering merger as early as June 1960. At a meeting of Commonwealth Prime Ministers, he mentioned to Lord Perth of the Colonial Office that he was open to a merger if a 'Grand Design' including not just Singapore but also British Borneo could be offered as some sort of package deal. Not only would it greatly benefit the territory, resources and population under his control, but the combination of indigenous Bornean peoples and Peninsular Malays (collectively termed Bumiputera) would counterbalance the increased numbers of Singaporean Chinese.

On 27 May 1961 at the Foreign Correspondents Association of Southeast Asia, Tunku announced that a closer association between Malaya, Singapore and the Borneo territories was a distinct possibility. Furthermore, he was calling not just for a customs union but a full union into a single political entity, the Federation of Malaysia.

Referendum

Malaysia Agreement

Singapore-specific provisions included:
 Singapore would retain control on education and labour. Defence, external affairs and internal security would come under the jurisdiction of the federal government 
 Singapore would have only 15 seats in the federal parliament instead of 25 seats (as was entitled by the size of its electorate) in return for this increased autonomy 
 Singapore would pay 40% of its total revenue to the federal government. It would disburse a $150 million loan to the Borneo territories, of which two-thirds would be interest-free for five years. A common market would be implemented over twelve years. 
 Singapore citizens would become Malaysian citizens while retaining Singapore citizenship, but they could only vote in Singapore.

Merger
Merger was originally scheduled for 31 August 1963 to coincide with the official independence day of Malaysia. However it was postponed by Tunku Abdul Rahman to 16 September 1963, to accommodate a United Nations mission to North Borneo and Sarawak to ensure that they really wanted a merger, which was prompted by Indonesian objections to the formation of Malaysia.

Nonetheless, on 31 August 1963 (the original Malaysia Day), Lee Kuan Yew stood in front of a crowd at the Padang in Singapore and unilaterally declared Singapore's independence. On 16 September 1963, coincidentally Lee's fortieth birthday, he once again stood in front of a crowd at the Padang and this time proclaimed Singapore as part of Malaysia. Pledging his loyalty to the Central Government, Tunku and his colleagues, Lee asked for ‘an honourable relationship between the states and the Central Government, a relationship between brothers, and not a relationship between masters and servants'.

Reasons for merger

Independence from Britain
Singapore merged with Malaya to achieve independence from the British colonial government. The British treatment of the locals since the British colonisation of Singapore in 1819 and the British failure to defend Singapore against Japanese invasion in February 1942 led to animosity and disdain against the British colonial rule in the post-war years. These sentiments culminated in strikes and riots in Singapore, such as the Hock Lee Bus Riots and the Anti-National Service riots in the 1950s. By merging with Malaya, the British would not have a reason to continue to rule over Singapore and use the communist threat as an excuse to rule over Singapore. Only a merger with Malaya would release Singapore from the clutches of British colonial rule and grant it absolute independence from the British.

Economic security
Singapore also wanted to merge with Malaya for economic reasons. Singapore was facing serious unemployment problems in the early 1960s. By merging with Malaya, Singapore believed to be able to overcome the unemployment crisis. Unemployment became the most serious issue for the PAP government when it assumed power to govern Singapore in 1959. The lack of natural resources, the low level of literacy rate among the local population, and the lack of hinterland caused the unemployment situation in Singapore to soar during the early 1960s.

Malaya was a large country blessed with natural resources. Singapore wished to leverage Malaya's economic advantages by proposing a common market strategy that would mutually benefit both nations. The PAP administration believed that a merger would also provide the locals an opportunity to find jobs in Malaya and thus alleviate the chronic unemployment problem in Singapore. This policy eventually allowed the party to continue their rule in Singapore.

National security
The merger was also proposed to attain security from the acute internal and external threat posed by communism in both Singapore and Malaya. The State of Emergency imposed by the British in Singapore and Malaya from 1948 to 1960 is a reflection of the threat posed by the communists who were striving to replace British rule of Singapore and Malaya with a communist government.

The Emergency Rule was lifted in 1960. But still the countries in Southeast Asia faced a threat from the communists. Malaya was a strong anti-communist country and would be able to provide Singapore with security and protection from the communist threat. While Singapore benefitted by the protection of the larger country, Malaya was also able to allay fears about its southern neighbour falling into the hands of the communists and acting as a launch pad for communist infiltration.

Post-merger

Economic disagreement
The Singapore and federal governments disagreed over economic issues. As part of the Malaysia Agreement, Singapore agreed to contribute 40% of its total revenue to the federal government and provide largely interest-free loans to Sabah and Sarawak, in exchange for establishment of a common market. However in July 1965, Malaysian Finance Minister Tan Siew Sin proposed raising the contribution to 60% and hinted 'that unless Singapore agrees to pay more, the common market would be slow in coming about'. This was refused by Singapore's Finance Minister, Goh Keng Swee, who accused Kuala Lumpur of imposing tariffs on Singapore-made products. Both sides also disagreed over the issuance of the loan, but agreed to refer this issue to the World Bank for arbitration.

Political disagreement

The Federal Government of Malaysia, dominated by the United Malays National Organisation (UMNO), was concerned that as long as Singapore remained in the Federation, the bumiputera policy of affirmative action in favor of Malays and the indigenous population would be undermined and therefore run counter to its agenda of addressing economic disparities between racial groups. This stance clashed with the PAP's repeated pledges for a "Malaysian Malaysia" – the equal treatment of all races in Malaysia by the government which should serve Malaysian citizens without any regard for the economic conditions of any particular race. Another contributing factor was fear that the economic dominance of Singapore's port would inevitably shift economical and political power away from Kuala Lumpur in time, should Singapore remain in the Federation.

Racial tensions
Racial tensions increased dramatically within a year. Despite the Malaysian government conceding citizenship to the many Chinese immigrants after independence, the Chinese in Singapore disdained the Federal policies of affirmative action, which granted special privileges to the Malays in Article 153 of the Constitution of Malaysia. Financial and economic benefits were given to Malays and Islam was recognised as the sole official religion, although non-Muslims maintained freedom of worship. Malays and Muslims in Singapore were being increasingly incited by the Federal Government's accusations that the PAP was mistreating the Malays.

Numerous racial riots resulted, and curfews were frequently imposed to restore order. These were collectively termed the 1964 race riots, the largest and deadliest of which occurred on 21 July 1964. The immediate antecedent event was a speech by Syed Jaafar Albar, backed by Federation Deputy Prime Minister Abdul Razak Hussein, at the New Star Cinema in Pasir Panjang on 12 July 1964, where he accused Lee Kuan Yew of being an oppressor and alleged that the fate of the Malays was even worse than it was during the Japanese occupation. He declared to an excited audience of several thousand Malays that 'if there is unity, no force in this world can trample us down...  Not one Lee Kuan Yew, a thousand Lee Kuan Yew... we finish them off...' The crowd responded enthusiastically with cries to arrest Lee and Othman Wok, and crush and kill them. Events escalated over the following week, culminating in an article in the Utusan Melayu on 20 July 1964 titled 'Challenge to all Malays to all Malays – UMNO Youths; Lee Kuan Yew Condemned; Teacher forced student to smell pork – Protest'. The day after on 21 July 1964, Racial riots broke out during the celebratory procession of Muhammad's birthday near Kallang Gasworks, resulting in 4 deaths and 178 injured at the end of that first day, and 23 deaths and 454 injuries by the time the riot was quelled. More riots had broken out in September 1964.  The prices for food skyrocketed when the transportation system was disrupted during the unrest, causing further hardship.

The external political situation was also tense at the time, with Indonesia actively against the establishment of the Federation of Malaysia. President Sukarno of Indonesia declared a state of Konfrontasi (Confrontation) against Malaysia, and initiated military and other actions against the new nation, including the bombing of MacDonald House in Singapore in March 1965 by Indonesian commandos which killed three people. Indonesia also conducted seditious activities to provoke the Malays against the Chinese.

Expulsion

On 7 August 1965, Prime Minister Tunku Abdul Rahman, seeing no alternative to avoid further bloodshed, advised the Parliament of Malaysia that it should vote to expel Singapore from Malaysia. Despite last-ditch attempts by PAP leaders, including Lee Kuan Yew, to keep Singapore as a state in the union, the Parliament on 9 August 1965 voted 126–0 in favour of the expulsion of Singapore, with Members of Parliament from Singapore not present. On that day, a tearful Lee announced that Singapore was a sovereign, independent nation and assumed the role of Prime Minister of the new nation. His speech included these words: "I mean for me it is a moment of anguish because all my life… you see the whole of my adult life…  I have believed in merger and the unity of these two territories. You know it's a people connected by geography, economics, and ties of kinship…"

While it has previously been taken as historical common knowledge that Singapore had been expelled from Malaysia unilaterally by the Kuala Lumpur Government, recently declassified documents from the Albatross File (taken from a 1980s interview where Goh referred to Merger with Malaysia as an "Albatross around [their] necks"), revealed that as early as July 1964, negotiations had begun between the PAP and the Alliance. In a handwritten letter, Lee Kuan Yew formally authorised Goh Keng Swee to negotiate with Alliance leadership in order to negotiate and plan the eventual exit of Singapore from the Federation, and over the next year, the two parties coordinated to arrange matters such that when the Tunku announced Singapore's expulsion and the PAP were "forced" to establish an independent government, it would be presented as a "fait accompli" that could not be jeopardised by popular uproar or opposition, which was still in favour of Merger. Having already reaped the political benefits of Operation Coldstore, the crippling of the Singaporean Left, the detention of key Barisan Sosialis leaders like Lim Chin Siong, Lee and Goh both believed that this move would afford Singapore with the "best of both worlds", both isolated from the communal turmoil which they believed would inevitably engulf Malaysia while retaining the economic benefits of access to the Malaysian markets.

Under constitutional amendments passed in December that year, the new state became the Republic of Singapore, with the vice-regal representative or Yang di-Pertuan Negara, Yusof Ishak, becoming the first President, and the Legislative Assembly becoming the Parliament of Singapore. These changes were made retroactive to the date of Singapore's separation from Malaysia. The Malaya and British Borneo dollar remained legal tender until the introduction of the Singapore dollar in 1967. Before the currency split, there were discussions about a common currency between the Malaysian and Singaporean governments.

See also 
 History of Malaysia
 Proclamation of Malaysia
 PAP-UMNO relations
 History of the Republic of Singapore
 Independence of Singapore Agreement 1965
 Proclamation of Singapore

References

Further reading
 
 
  (An interview with the Prime Minister of Singapore regarding merger negotiations.)
 
 
S'pore must merge with Malaya, Straits Times, 7 May 1952, 1. (From NewspaperSG)|url=https://eresources.nlb.gov.sg/newspapers/Digitised/Article/straitstimes19520507-1.2.21

 
1963 in Singapore
1964 in Singapore
1965 in Singapore
1963 in Malaysia
Formation of Malaysia
States of Malaysia
States and territories established in 1963
States and territories disestablished in 1965